The following is a list of Malayalam films released in the year 1992.

Dubbed films

References

 1992
1992
Malayalam
 Mal
1992 in Indian cinema